Global apartheid is a term used to describe how Global North countries are engaged in a project of "racialization, segregation, political intervention, mobility controls, capitalist plunder, and labor exploitation" affecting people from the Global South. Proponents of the concept argue that a close examination of the global system reveals it to be a kind of apartheid writ large with striking resemblance to the system of racial segregation in South Africa from 1948 to 1994, but based on borders and national sovereignty. 

The concept of global apartheid has been developed by many researchers, including Titus Alexander, Bruno Amoroso, Patrick Bond, Gernot Kohler, Arjun Makhijiani, Ali Mazuri, Vandana Shiva, Anthony H. Richmond, Joseph Nevins, Muhammed Asadi, Gustav Fridolin, and many others. More recent references are in Falk's Re-Framing the International,  Amoroso's Global apartheid: globalisation, economic marginalisation, political destabilisation, Peterson's A Critical Rewriting of Global Political Economy, Jones's Crimes Against Humanity: A Beginner's Guide and Global Human Smuggling by Kyle and Koslowski, and New Social Movements in the African Diaspora: Challenging Global Apartheid. and Bosak's Kairos, Crisis, and Global Apartheid

Origin and use 
The first use of the term may have been by Gernot Koehler in a 1978 Working Paper for the World Order Models Project.  In 1995, Koehler developed this in The Three Meanings of Global Apartheid: Empirical, Normative, Existential.

Its best known use was by Thabo Mbeki, then-President of South Africa, in a 2002 speech, drawing comparisons of the status of the world's people, economy, and access to natural resources to the apartheid era.  Mbeki got the term from Titus Alexander, initiator of Charter 99, a campaign for global democracy, who was also present at the UN Millennium Summit and gave him a copy of Unravelling Global Apartheid.

Concept 
Minority rule in global governance is based on national sovereignty rather than racial identity, but in many other respects the history and structures of apartheid South Africa can be seen as a microcosm of the world. Following the Great Depression in the 1930s and the Second World War, the United States and United Kingdom used their political power to create systems of economic management and protection to mitigate the worst effects of free trade and neutralise the competing appeals of communism and national socialism . In South Africa civilized labour policies restricted public employment to whites, reserved skilled jobs for whites and controlled the movement of non-whites through a system of pass laws. In the West, escalating tariff barriers  reserved manufacturing work for Europeans and Americans while immigration laws controlled the movement of immigrants seeking work.

Alexander argued that apartheid was a system of one-sided protectionism, in which the rich white minority used their political power to exclude the black majority from competing on equal terms, and warned that "the intensification of economic competition as a result of greater free trade is increasing political pressures for one-sided protectionism."

At a political level, the West still dominates global decision-making through minority control of the central banking system (Bank of International Settlements), IMF, World Bank, Security Council and other institutions of global governance.  The G8 (now G7) represent less than 15% of world population, yet have over 60% of its income.  80% of the permanent members of the UN Security Council represent white Western states, 60% from Europe. The West has veto power in the World Bank, IMF and WTO and regulates global monetary policy through the Bank of International Settlements (BIS).  By tradition, the head of the World Bank is always a US citizen, nominated by the US president, and the IMF is a European.  Although the rest of the world now has a majority in many international institutions, it does not have the political power to reject decisions by the Western minority.

Alexander claims there are numerous pillars of global apartheid including:
veto power by the Western minority in the UN Security Council 
voting powers in the IMF and World Bank
dominance of the World Trade Organization through effective veto power and ‘weight of trade’ rather than formal voting power
one-sided rules of trade, which give privileged protection to Western agriculture and other interests while opening markets in the Majority World
protection of ‘hard currency’ through the central banking system through the Bank of International Settlements 
immigration controls which manage the flow of labour to meet the needs of Western economies 
use of aid and investment to control elites in the Majority World through reward and punishment 
support for coups or military intervention in countries which defy Western dominance

More recently, scholars such as Thanh-Dam Truong and Des Gasper, inTransnational Migration and Human Security and Kyle and Koslowsk in In Global Human Smuggling,  analyse the rise of migrant smuggling and human trafficking in terms of the "structural violence generated by the escalation of border interdiction by states as part of the system of global apartheid."  Political demands for protectionism and physical barriers between the West and the Majority World, such as President Trump's wall between Mexico and the US as well as barriers round the EU  follow similar economic pressures to those which entrenched apartheid in South Africa.

Law scholar Dimitry Kochenov argues that citizenship and nationality law is a form of apartheid that creates unequal protection that would never be accepted within the borders of any liberal democracy. "Like slavery, like sexism, like racism, citizenship knows no justification once you leave the purview of those few whom it unduly privileges."

See also

 Climate apartheid
 Eco-apartheid

References 

International relations
World government
Governance
Global issues
Apartheid